Lago Garcia is a lake in the Province of Palermo, Sicily, Italy. At an elevation of 194 m, its surface area is 5.07 km2.

Lakes of Sicily